Pruntytown State Farm Wildlife Management Area, is located near Pruntytown, West Virginia in Taylor County.  The WMA is managed as a beef cattle farm by the West Virginia Department of Agriculture.  Located on  gently sloping farmland with hay and pasture fields and woodlots on the steeper slopes.

Access to Pruntytown State Farm WMA is from U.S. Route 50 about 1/2 mile west of Pruntytown or from County Route 38 south of Pruntytown.

Hunting and Fishing

Hunting opportunities in Pruntytown State Farm WMA include coyote, deer,  grouse, mourning dove, rabbit, and turkey.

Although camping is not allowed at the WMA, camping is available at nearby Tygart Lake State Park. A firearm safety zone is maintained around the barns and other farm buildings.

See also

Animal conservation
Hunting
List of West Virginia wildlife management areas

References

External links
West Virginia DNR District 1 Wildlife Management Areas
West Virginia Hunting Regulations
West Virginia Fishing Regulations

Wildlife management areas of West Virginia
Protected areas of Taylor County, West Virginia